The Rivers State Economic Advisory Council (RSEAC) was established on 3 October 2007 to serve as a "policy think-tank" of the Rivers State government. Its main function is to advise the government on important policy issues, particularly those relating to the economic development of the state. At present, the council is composed of 40 members and is headquartered at Fleet House, Port Harcourt.

Emeritus Professor Nimi Dimkpa Briggs is the Chairman of the council since 2007. Other key staff include:

Sir Joe E. Akpa, Director and Head of Secretariat
Mrs T. Tamuno, Recorder
Miss. Tamunopriye Nnah, Research Officer
Mrs. Ruth C. Boms, Principal Confidential Secretary

References

External links
Official website

Government agencies established in 2007
2007 establishments in Nigeria
2000s establishments in Rivers State
Organizations based in Port Harcourt
Economy of Rivers State
Economic Advisory Council
Think tanks based in Nigeria
Political and economic think tanks based in Africa